Oomyces is a genus of fungi in the family Acrospermaceae.

References

External links

Acrospermaceae
Dothideomycetes genera